The 2011 Atlanta Beat season is the club's second season in Women's Professional Soccer and their second consecutive season in the top division of women's soccer in the American soccer pyramid. Including the WUSA franchise, this is the club's sixth year of existence.

Review and events 
Prior to the beginning of the 2011 WPS season, the Atlanta Beat organization scheduled several preseason friendlies against local universities. For the preseason, the Beat played Auburn University twice, and then University of North Carolina, Georgia and Florida State. In preseason, the Beat went on an undefeated 5-0-0 run, and only conceded one goal in the process.

On April 9, in front of over slightly 4,000 spectators, the Beat opened their season with a 1–4 loss to Boston Breakers.

Match results

Preseason

WPS

Club

Roster

Management and staff 
Front Office

Coaching Staff

Standings

Statistics

Field Players

Goalkeepers

Transfers

In

Awards

WPS Player of the Week

See also 
 2011 U.S. Open Cup
 2011 in American soccer
 Atlanta Beat

References 

2011
American soccer clubs 2011 season
2011 Women's Professional Soccer season
2011 in sports in Georgia (U.S. state)